The S.A. Lay House is a historic house at Glade Street and United States Route 65 in Marshall, Arkansas.  It is a single-story wood-frame structure with a front-facing gable roof.  A gabled porch extends across much of the front, supported by brick columns separated by a slightly arched span.  A similarly styled porte cochere extends to the right, both roof lines featuring Craftsman-style exposed rafter ends.  The house was built in 1921, and is noted for its local architectural significance.

The house was listed on the National Register of Historic Places in 1993.

See also
National Register of Historic Places listings in Searcy County, Arkansas

References

Houses on the National Register of Historic Places in Arkansas
Houses in Searcy County, Arkansas
National Register of Historic Places in Searcy County, Arkansas